The 1996 DEP Sessions is a collaborative studio album by British musicians Tony Iommi and Glenn Hughes, released through Sanctuary and Mayan Records in 2004.

Material for The 1996 DEP Sessions was originally recorded in 1996, and was circulated among fans as a bootleg recording dubbed Eighth Star: on this recording, two of the final tracks were missing, while a cover of Jethro Tull's To Cry You A Song (mistitled "Shaking My Wings") was included (which did not feature Tony Iommi). The album title reflects the fact that the tracks were recorded in the DEP International Studios in Digbeth, Birmingham.

The album's drum tracks were originally performed by Dave Holland, formerly of Judas Priest and one-time bandmate of Glenn Hughes in Trapeze. After Holland was convicted of attempted rape in 2003, Iommi had the drum tracks re-recorded by Jimmy Copley prior to release to prevent the album from having any association with a sex offender.

Track listing

Personnel
 Tony Iommi – guitars
 Glenn Hughes – vocals, bass
 Don Airey – keyboards
 Jimmy Copley – drums
 Neil Murray - additional bass
 Geoff Nicholls - additional keyboards
 Mike Exeter – additional keyboards, engineering, mixing

References

2004 EPs
Glenn Hughes albums
Collaborative albums
Heavy metal EPs
Sanctuary Records EPs
Tony Iommi albums